Rafael Rodríguez González (born 10 January 1972) is a Mexican politician from the Institutional Revolutionary Party. From 2009 to 2012 he served as Deputy of the LXI Legislature of the Mexican Congress representing Veracruz.

References

1972 births
Living people
Politicians from Veracruz
Institutional Revolutionary Party politicians
21st-century Mexican politicians
Deputies of the LXI Legislature of Mexico
Members of the Chamber of Deputies (Mexico) for Veracruz